In geometry, a complex polytope is a generalization of a polytope in real space to an analogous structure in a complex Hilbert space, where each real dimension is accompanied by an imaginary one.

A complex polytope may be understood as a collection of complex points, lines, planes, and so on, where every point is the junction of multiple lines, every line of multiple planes, and so on.

Precise definitions exist only for the regular complex polytopes, which are configurations. The regular complex polytopes have been completely characterized, and can be described using a symbolic notation developed by Coxeter.

Some complex polytopes which are not fully regular have also been described.

Definitions and introduction
The complex line  has one dimension with real coordinates and another with imaginary coordinates. Applying real coordinates to both dimensions is said to give it two dimensions over the real numbers. A real plane, with the imaginary axis labelled as such, is called an Argand diagram. Because of this it is sometimes called the complex plane. Complex 2-space (also sometimes called the complex plane) is thus a four-dimensional space over the reals, and so on in higher dimensions.

A complex n-polytope in complex n-space is the analogue of a real n-polytope in real n-space.

There is no natural complex analogue of the ordering of points on a real line (or of the associated combinatorial properties). Because of this a complex polytope cannot be seen as a contiguous surface and it does not bound an interior in the way that a real polytope does.

In the case of regular polytopes, a precise definition can be made by using the notion of symmetry. For any regular polytope the symmetry group (here a complex reflection group, called a Shephard group) acts transitively on the flags, that is, on the nested sequences of a point contained in a line contained in a plane and so on.

More fully, say that a collection P of affine subspaces (or flats) of a complex unitary space V of dimension n is a regular complex polytope if it meets the following conditions:
 for every  such that , if  are flats of P of dimensions i, j, then the set of flats between F and G is connected, in the sense that one can get from any member of this set to any other by a sequence of containments; and

(Here, a flat of dimension −1 is taken to mean the empty set.)  Thus, by definition, regular complex polytopes are configurations in complex unitary space.

The regular complex polytopes were discovered by Shephard (1952), and the theory was further developed by Coxeter (1974).

A complex polytope exists in the complex space of equivalent dimension. For example, the vertices of a complex polygon are points in the complex plane , and the edges are complex lines  existing as (affine) subspaces of the plane and intersecting at the vertices. Thus, an edge can be given a coordinate system consisting of a single complex number.

In a regular complex polytope the vertices incident on the edge are arranged symmetrically about their centroid, which is often used as the origin of the edge's coordinate system (in the real case the centroid is just the midpoint of the edge). The symmetry arises from a complex reflection about the centroid; this reflection will leave the magnitude of any vertex unchanged, but change its argument by a fixed amount, moving it to the coordinates of the next vertex in order. So we may assume (after a suitable choice of scale) that the vertices on the edge satisfy the equation  where p is the number of incident vertices. Thus, in the Argand diagram of the edge, the vertex points lie at the vertices of a regular polygon centered on the origin.

Three real projections of regular complex polygon 4{4}2 are illustrated above, with edges a, b, c, d, e, f, g, h. It has 16 vertices, which for clarity have not been individually marked. Each edge has four vertices and each vertex lies on two edges, hence each edge meets four other edges. In the first diagram, each edge is represented by a square. The sides of the square are not parts of the polygon but are drawn purely to help visually relate the four vertices. The edges are laid out symmetrically. (Note that the diagram looks similar to the B4 Coxeter plane projection of the tesseract, but it is structurally different).

The middle diagram abandons octagonal symmetry in favour of clarity. Each edge is shown as a real line, and each meeting point of two lines is a vertex. The connectivity between the various edges is clear to see.

The last diagram gives a flavour of the structure projected into three dimensions: the two cubes of vertices are in fact the same size but are seen in perspective at different distances away in the fourth dimension.

Regular complex one-dimensional polytopes 

A real 1-dimensional polytope exists as a closed segment in the real line , defined by its two end points or vertices in the line. Its Schläfli symbol is {} .

Analogously, a complex 1-polytope exists as a set of p vertex points in the complex line . These may be represented as a set of points in an Argand diagram (x,y)=x+iy. A regular complex 1-dimensional polytope p{} has p (p ≥ 2) vertex points arranged to form a convex regular polygon {p} in the Argand plane.

Unlike points on the real line, points on the complex line have no natural ordering. Thus, unlike real polytopes, no interior can be defined. Despite this, complex 1-polytopes are often drawn, as here, as a bounded regular polygon in the Argand plane.

A regular real 1-dimensional polytope is represented by an empty Schläfli symbol {}, or Coxeter-Dynkin diagram . The dot or node of the Coxeter-Dynkin diagram itself represents a reflection generator while the circle around the node means the generator point is not on the reflection, so its reflective image is a distinct point from itself. By extension, a regular complex 1-dimensional polytope in  has Coxeter-Dynkin diagram , for any positive integer p, 2 or greater, containing p vertices. p can be suppressed if it is 2. It can also be represented by an empty Schläfli symbol p{}, }p{, {}p, or p{2}1. The 1 is a notational placeholder, representing a nonexistent reflection, or a period 1 identity generator. (A 0-polytope, real or complex is a point, and is represented as } {, or 1{2}1.)

The symmetry is denoted by the Coxeter diagram , and can alternatively be described in Coxeter notation as p[], []p or ]p[, p[2]1 or p[1]p. The symmetry is isomorphic to the cyclic group, order p. The subgroups of p[] are any whole divisor d, d[], where d≥2.

When p = 2, the generator is eπi = –1, the same as a point reflection in the real plane.

In higher complex polytopes, 1-polytopes form p-edges. A 2-edge is similar to an ordinary real edge, in that it contains two vertices, but need not exist on a real line.

Regular complex polygons
While 1-polytopes can have unlimited p, finite regular complex polygons, excluding the double prism polygons p{4}2, are limited to 5-edge (pentagonal edges) elements, and infinite regular apeirogons also include 6-edge (hexagonal edges) elements.

Notations

Shephard's modified Schläfli notation

Shephard originally devised a modified form of Schläfli's notation for regular polytopes. For a polygon bounded by p1-edges, with a p2-set as vertex figure and overall symmetry group of order g, we denote the polygon as p1(g)p2.

The number of vertices V is then g/p2 and the number of edges E is g/p1.

The complex polygon illustrated above has eight square edges (p1=4) and sixteen vertices (p2=2). From this we can work out that g = 32, giving the modified Schläfli symbol 4(32)2.

Coxeter's revised modified Schläfli notation

A more modern notation p1{q}p2 is due to Coxeter, and is based on group theory. As a symmetry group, its symbol is p1[q]p2.

The symmetry group p1[q]p2 is represented by 2 generators R1, R2, where: R1p1 = R2p2 = I. If q is even, (R2R1)q/2 = (R1R2)q/2. If q is odd, (R2R1)(q−1)/2R2 = (R1R2)(q−1)/2R1. When q is odd, p1=p2.

For 4[4]2 has R14 = R22 = I, (R2R1)2 = (R1R2)2.

For 3[5]3 has R13 = R23 = I, (R2R1)2R2 = (R1R2)2R1.

Coxeter-Dynkin diagrams

The nodes p and r represent mirrors producing p and r images in the plane. Unlabeled nodes in a diagram have implicit 2 labels.

One limitation, nodes connected by odd branch orders must have identical node orders. If they do not, the group will create "starry" polygons, with overlapping element.

12 Irreducible Shephard groups

Its symmetry is written as p[q]r, called a Shephard group, analogous to a Coxeter group, while also allowing unitary reflections.

A regular complex polygon can be drawn in orthogonal projection with h-gonal symmetry.

The rank 2 solutions that generate complex polygons are: 

Excluded solutions with odd q and unequal p and r are: 6[3]2, 6[3]3, 9[3]3, 12[3]3, ..., 5[5]2, 6[5]2, 8[5]2, 9[5]2, 4[7]2, 9[5]2, 3[9]2, and 3[11]2.

The dual polygon of p{q}r is r{q}p. A polygon of the form p{q}p is self-dual. Groups of the form p[2q]2 have a half symmetry p[q]p, so a regular polygon  is the same as quasiregular . As well, regular polygon with the same node orders, have an alternated construction , allowing adjacent edges to be two different colors.

The group order, g, is used to compute the total number of vertices and edges. It will have g/r vertices, and g/p edges. When p=r, the number of vertices and edges are equal. This condition is required when q is odd.

Matrix generators 
The group p[q]r, can be represented by two matrices:

With
 k=

Examples

Enumeration of regular complex polygons 
Coxeter enumerated the complex polygons in Table III of Regular Complex Polytopes.

Visualizations of regular complex polygons 
Polygons of the form p{2r}q can be visualized by q color sets of p-edge. Each p-edge is seen as a regular polygon, while there are no faces.

2D orthogonal projections of complex polygons 2{r}q

Polygons of the form 2{4}q are called generalized orthoplexes. They share vertices with the 4D q-q duopyramids, vertices connected by 2-edges. 

Complex polygons p{4}2

Polygons of the form p{4}2 are called generalized hypercubes (squares for polygons). They share vertices with the 4D p-p duoprisms, vertices connected by p-edges. Vertices are drawn in green, and p-edges are drawn in alternate colors, red and blue. The perspective is distorted slightly for odd dimensions to move overlapping vertices from the center.

3D perspective projections of complex polygons p{4}2. The duals 2{4}p are seen by adding vertices inside the edges, and adding edges in place of vertices.

Other Complex polygons p{r}2

2D orthogonal projections of complex polygons, p{r}p

Polygons of the form p{r}p have equal number of vertices and edges. They are also self-dual.

Regular complex polytopes

In general, a regular complex polytope is represented by Coxeter as p{z1}q{z2}r{z3}s… or Coxeter diagram …, having symmetry p[z1]q[z2]r[z3]s… or ….

There are infinite families of regular complex polytopes that occur in all dimensions, generalizing the hypercubes and cross polytopes in real space.  Shephard's "generalized orthotope" generalizes the hypercube; it has symbol given by γ = p{4}2{3}2…2{3}2 and diagram ….  Its symmetry group has diagram p[4]2[3]2…2[3]2; in the Shephard–Todd classification, this is the group G(p, 1, n) generalizing the signed permutation matrices. Its dual regular polytope, the "generalized cross polytope", is represented by the symbol β = 2{3}2{3}2…2{4}p and diagram ….

Coxeter also gives it symbol γ or β as 1-dimensional generalized hypercube or cross polytope.

A dual complex polytope is constructed by exchanging k and (n-1-k)-elements of an n-polytope. For example, a dual complex polygon has vertices centered on each edge, and new edges are centered at the old vertices. A v-valence vertex creates a new v-edge, and e-edges become e-valence vertices. The dual of a regular complex polytope has a reversed symbol. Regular complex polytopes with symmetric symbols, i.e. p{q}p, p{q}r{q}p, p{q}r{s}r{q}p, etc. are self dual.

Enumeration of regular complex polyhedra 

A complex regular polyhedron p{n1}q{n2}r requires both g1 = order(p[n1]q) and g2 = order(q[n2]r) be finite.

Given g = order(p[n1]q[n2]r), the number of vertices is g/g2, and the number of faces is g/g1. The number of edges is g/pr.

Visualizations of regular complex polyhedra 

2D orthogonal projections of complex polyhedra, p{s}t{r}r

Generalized octahedra

All elements are simplexes.

Generalized cubes

Elements are lower dimensional generalized cubes.

Enumeration of regular complex 4-polytopes 

Visualizations of regular complex 4-polytopes 

Generalized 4-orthoplexes
All elements are simplexes.

Generalized 4-cubes

Elements are lower dimensional generalized cubes.

Enumeration of regular complex 5-polytopes 

Visualizations of regular complex 5-polytopes 
Generalized 5-orthoplexes
All elements are simplexes.

Generalized 5-cubes

Elements are lower dimensional generalized cubes.

Enumeration of regular complex 6-polytopes

Visualizations of regular complex 6-polytopes 

Generalized 6-orthoplexes
All elements are simplexes.

Generalized 6-cubes

Elements are lower dimensional generalized cubes.

Enumeration of regular complex apeirotopes 
Coxeter enumerated this list of nonstarry regular complex apeirotopes or honeycombs.

For each dimension there are 12 apeirotopes symbolized as δ exists in any dimensions , or  if p=q=2. Coxeter calls these generalized cubic honeycombs for n>2.

Each has proportional element counts given as:
k-faces = , where  and n! denotes the factorial of n.

Regular complex 1-polytopes 

Regular complex apeirogons 

Rank 2 complex apeirogons have symmetry p[q]r, where 1/p + 2/q + 1/r = 1. Coxeter expresses them as δ where q is constrained to satisfy .

There are 8 solutions: 

A regular complex apeirogon p{q}r has p-edges and r-gonal vertex figures. The dual apeirogon of p{q}r is r{q}p. An apeirogon of the form p{q}p is self-dual. Groups of the form p[2q]2 have a half symmetry p[q]p, so a regular apeirogon  is the same as quasiregular .

Apeirogons can be represented on the Argand plane share four different vertex arrangements. Apeirogons of the form 2{q}r have a vertex arrangement as {q/2,p}. The form p{q}2 have vertex arrangement as r{p,q/2}. Apeirogons of the form p{4}r have vertex arrangements {p,r}.

The first is an index 2 subgroup of the second.

Regular complex apeirohedra 
There are 22 regular complex apeirohedra, of the form p{a}q{b}r. 8 are self-dual (p=r and a=b), while 14 exist as dual polytope pairs. Three are entirely real (p=q=r=2).

Coxeter symbolizes 12 of them as δ or p{4}2{4}r is the regular form of the product apeirotope δ × δ or p{q}r × p{q}r, where q is determined from p and r.

Also  = .

Regular complex 3-apeirotopes 
Coxeter expresses 12 of them by δ where q is constrained to satisfy . These can also be decomposed as product apeirotopes:  = . The first case is the  cubic honeycomb.

Regular complex 4-apeirotopes 
Coxeter expresses 12 of them by δ where q is constrained to satisfy . These can also be decomposed as product apeirotopes:  = . The first case is the  tesseractic honeycomb. The 16-cell honeycomb and 24-cell honeycomb are real solutions. The last solution is generated has Witting polytope elements.

Regular complex 5-apeirotopes and higher 
These can also be decomposed a product of n apeirogons:  ...  =  ... . The first case is the real  hypercube honeycomb.

van Oss polygon 

A van Oss polygon is a regular polygon in the plane (real plane , or unitary plane ) in which both an edge and the centroid of a regular polytope lie, and formed of elements of the polytope. Not all regular polytopes have Van Oss polygons.

For example, the van Oss polygons of a real octahedron are the three squares whose planes pass through its center. In contrast a cube does not have a van Oss polygon because the edge-to-center plane cuts diagonally across two square faces and the two edges of the cube which lie in the plane do not form a polygon.

Infinite honeycombs also have van Oss apeirogons. For example, the real square tiling and triangular tiling have apeirogons {∞} van Oss apeirogons.

If it exists, the van Oss polygon of regular complex polytope of the form p{q}r{s}t... has p-edges.

Non-regular complex polytopes

Product complex polytopes 

Some complex polytopes can be represented as Cartesian products. These product polytopes are not strictly regular since they'll have more than one facet type, but some can represent lower symmetry of regular forms if all the orthogonal polytopes are identical. More general products, like p{}×q{} have real representations as the 4-dimensional p-q duoprisms. The dual of a product polytope can be written as a sum p{}+q{} and have real representations as the 4-dimensional p-q duopyramid.

Quasiregular polygons 
A quasiregular polygon is a truncation of a regular polygon. The quasiregular polygon has p vertices on the p-edges of the regular form.

Quasiregular apeirogons 
There are 7 quasiregular complex apeirogons which alternate edges of a regular apeirogon and its regular dual. The vertex arrangements of these apeirogon have real representations with the regular and uniform tilings of the Euclidean plane. The last column for the 6{3}6 apeirogon is not only self-dual, but the dual coincides with itself with overlapping hexagonal edges, thus their quasiregular form also has overlapping hexagonal edges, so it can't be drawn with two alternating colors like the others. The symmetry of the self-dual families can be doubled, so creating an identical geometry as the regular forms:  =

Quasiregular polyhedra 

Like real polytopes, a complex quasiregular polyhedron can be constructed as a rectification (a complete truncation) of a regular polyhedron. Vertices are created mid-edge of the regular polyhedron and faces of the regular polyhedron and its dual are positioned alternating across common edges.

For example, a p-generalized cube, has p3 vertices, 3p2 edges, and 3p p-generalized square faces, while the p-generalized octahedron, has 3p vertices, 3p2 edges and p3 triangular faces. The middle quasiregular form p-generalized cuboctahedron, has 3p2 vertices, 3p3 edges, and 3p+p3 faces.

Other complex polytopes with unitary reflections of period two 
Other nonregular complex polytopes can be constructed within unitary reflection groups that don't make linear Coxeter graphs. In Coxeter diagrams with loops Coxeter marks a special period interior, like  or symbol (11 1 1)3, and group [1 1 1]3. These complex polytopes have not been systematically explored beyond a few cases.

The group  is defined by 3 unitary reflections, R1, R2, R3, all order 2: R12 = R12 = R32 = (R1R2)3 =  (R2R3)3 = (R3R1)3 = (R1R2R3R1)p = 1. The period p can be seen as a double rotation in real .

As with all Wythoff constructions, polytopes generated by reflections, the number of vertices of a single-ringed Coxeter diagram polytope is equal to the order of the group divided by the order of the subgroup where the ringed node is removed. For example, a real cube has Coxeter diagram , with octahedral symmetry  order 48, and subgroup dihedral symmetry  order 6, so the number of vertices of a cube is 48/6=8. Facets are constructed by removing one node furthest from the ringed node, for example  for the cube.

Coxeter represents these groups by the following symbols.

Coxeter calls some of these complex polyhedra almost regular because they have regular facets and vertex figures. The second is a fractional generalized cube, reducing p-edges into single vertices leaving ordinary 2-edges.

Coxeter defines other groups with anti-unitary constructions, for example these three. The first was discovered and drawn by Peter McMullen in 1966.

Visualizations

See also 
 Quaternionic polytope

Notes

References 
 Coxeter, H. S. M. and Moser, W. O. J.; Generators and Relations for Discrete Groups (1965), esp pp 67–80.
 
 Coxeter, H. S. M. and Shephard, G.C.; Portraits of a family of complex polytopes, Leonardo Vol 25, No 3/4, (1992), pp 239–244,
 Shephard, G.C.; Regular complex polytopes, Proc. London math. Soc. Series 3, Vol 2, (1952), pp 82–97.
 G. C. Shephard, J. A. Todd, Finite unitary reflection groups, Canadian Journal of Mathematics. 6(1954), 274-304 
 Gustav I. Lehrer and Donald E. Taylor, Unitary Reflection Groups, Cambridge University Press 2009

Further reading 

 F. Arthur Sherk, Peter McMullen, Anthony C. Thompson and Asia Ivić Weiss, editors: Kaleidoscopes — Selected Writings of H.S.M. Coxeter., Paper 25, Finite groups generated by unitary reflections, p 415-425, John Wiley, 1995, 
  Chapter 9 Unitary Groups and Hermitian Forms, pp. 289–298

Polytopes
Complex analysis